The ADC Nimbus was a British inline aero engine that first ran in 1926. The Nimbus was developed from the Siddeley Puma aero engine by Frank Halford of the Aircraft Disposal Company, the goal was to develop the Puma to produce its intended power output which Halford eventually achieved. The Nimbus was further developed into an air-cooled version known as the ADC Airsix which did not enter production and was not flown.

Applications
Airco DH.9
de Havilland DH.37
de Havilland DH.50
Nimbus Martinsyde
Vickers Vendace

Specifications (Nimbus)

See also

References

Notes

Bibliography

 Lumsden, Alec. British Piston Engines and their Aircraft. Marlborough, Wiltshire: Airlife Publishing, 2003. .

External links
Nimbus Martinsyde, Flight, July 1928

1920s aircraft piston engines
Nimbus